Alevonota is a genus of beetle belonging to the family Staphylinidae.

The genus was first described by Thomson in 1858.

The genus has almost cosmopolitan distribution.

Species:
 Alevonota rufotestacea (Kraatz, 1856)

References

Staphylinidae
Staphylinidae genera